is a song by Japanese recording artist Nanase Aikawa from her second studio album Paradox (1997). The track was composed by Tetsurō Oda and released as a single on October 7, 1996. It peaked at number 2 on the Oricon Singles Chart and was certified million by the Recording Industry Association of Japan (RIAJ).

Track listing

Charts and certifications

Sales and certifications

References

1990s ballads
1996 songs
1996 singles
Japanese-language songs
Songs written by Tetsurō Oda
Torch songs
Pop ballads